The 1992 NCAA Division III football season, part of the college football season organized by the NCAA at the Division III level in the United States, began in August 1992, and concluded with the NCAA Division III Football Championship, also known as the Stagg Bowl, in December 1992 at Hawkins Stadium in Bradenton, Florida. The Wisconsin–La Crosse Eagles won their first Division III championship by defeating the Washington & Jefferson Presidents, 16−12.

Program changes
After Glassboro State College changed its name to Rowan College of New Jersey in 1992, the Glassboro State Profs became the Rowan Profs at the start of the 1992 season.

Conference standings

Conference champions

Postseason
The 1992 NCAA Division III Football Championship playoffs were the 20th annual single-elimination tournament to determine the national champion of men's NCAA Division III college football. The championship Stagg Bowl game was held at Hawkins Stadium in Bradenton, Florida for the third, and final, time. Like the previous seven tournaments, this year's bracket featured sixteen teams.

Playoff bracket

See also
1992 NCAA Division I-A football season
1992 NCAA Division I-AA football season
1992 NCAA Division II football season

References